The Ministry of Culture Denmark (Danish: Kulturministeriet) is a ministry of the Danish Government, with responsibility for culture, sport and media.

History
The Ministry is located at Gammel Strand on  Nybrogade  opposite Slotsholmen. Originally, it was a three-winged building. Its construction started in 1729. In 1765, it was expanded with the complex with a new wing facing the canal which was designed was added by architect Philip de Lange (c. 1705-1766).

The Danish Ministry of Culture was founded in 1961 with Julius Bomholt as its first minister. In 1962, the ministry moved in after the building had undergone a thorough restoration.

Agencies and institutions

Agencies 
 Danish Heritage Agency
 Danish Arts Foundation (Statens Kunstfond)
 Danish Libraries and Media Agency
Nota Library and Expertise Center for people with print disabilities

Educational institutions 
 Royal Danish Academy of Fine Arts
 National Film School of Denmark
 Royal Danish Theatre's School of Ballet
 Danish Design School
 Royal School of Library and Information Science
 Royal Academy of Music, Aarhus/Aalborg
 Forfatterskolen

Associated institutions 
 Royal Danish Library
 Skibsbevaringsfonden

See also 
 List of Danish government ministries

References

External links 
 KUM English – Official website.

Culture
Denmark
Culture
Danish culture